Pryeria sinica, the euonymus defoliator moth is a species of moth of the Zygaenidae family. It is native to Asia and has been introduced in the United States, where it has been found in Maryland and Virginia.

The larvae feed on Euonymus and Celastrus species, including Euonymus alatus, Euonymus japonicus Euonymus fortunei, Euonymus sieboldianus, Euonymus kiautschovica and Celastrus punctatus.

References

Zygaenidae
Moths of Japan